Fredensborg Boldklub og Idrætsforening, known as Fredensborg BI, is a Danish association football club located in the municipality of Fredensborg, which plays in the Zealand Series. Founded on 6 June 1908, it is one of the oldest clubs in Danish football. It competed in the 2003 and 2009 Danish Cup tournaments.

Stadium
The stadium is used by Fredensborg BI and Fredensborg Atletik Forening og Pedalatleterne, the Fredensborg Athletes' and Cyclists Society. It holds 2,000 spectators, 100 of which are provided with seats. As of late 2008, the maximum number of spectators at one match has been 1,516 people.

Trainers
Chief trainer
Benny Johansen

Assistant trainer
 Freddi Kairies

Records
 Best national ranking: finished 4th in the 1987 Denmark Series

External links
FBI-Bold, official website 
Fredensborg BI  at Danish Football Association

Football clubs in Denmark
Fredensborg Municipality
Association football clubs established in 1908
1908 establishments in Denmark